Žuta Lokva  is a village in Croatia.

External links
 Location on map

Populated places in Lika-Senj County